Vung Tau Port is a group of seaports, one of the sea transport hubs of Vietnam. Vung Tau Port is located in Bà Rịa–Vũng Tàu province, Southeast region, Vietnam.

Vung Tau port includes the following component ports:

Cai Mep - Thi Vai Port, Sao Mai-Ben Dinh: This is the main port for container transport. Currently, the port is capable of receiving ships up to 200,000 DWT. The main container terminals are TCTT/TCIT, CMIT, TCTT, SSIT and Gemalink (expected to officially open January 2020). 
Ports of Phu My, My Xuan: a general port, a container port capable of receiving ships up to 30,000 DWT. As planned by the government of Vietnam, this port will be capable of receiving ships up to 80,000 DWT. 
Port on Dinh river: is capable of receiving ships up to 20,000 DWT, and will be capable to handle ships up to 30,000 DWT. 
Port of Ben Dam, Con Dao Island.

According to the approved plan, from now to 2020, two more harbors will be built, one is the Long Son Port serving the oil refinery, the other is Sao Mai-Ben Dinh serving passenger transportation.

National Route 51 will connect Cai Mep - Thi Vai Port to Ho Chi Minh City and the manufacturing centres in Đồng Nai Province and Bình Dương Province. However, as of December 2011 it is still under construction. As a result, goods still have to be shipped by barge from Ho Chi Minh City to Vung Tau.

References
Quyết định số 2190/QĐ-TTg ngày 24 tháng 12 năm 2009 của Chính phủ Việt Nam về việc phê duyệt quy hoạch hệ thống cảng biển Việt Nam đến năm 2020, tầm nhìn đến năm 2030 (Decision 2190/QĐ-TTg dated 24 December 2009 by the Vietnamese government on approval of port system in Vietnam til 2020, with vision to 2030) 

Ports and harbours of Vietnam
Buildings and structures in Bà Rịa-Vũng Tàu province